The Platino Award for Best Miniseries or TV series (Spanish: Premio Platino a la mejor teleserie iberoamericana) is one of the Platino Awards, Ibero-America's film awards. The category was first awarded at the 4th Platino Awards in 2017 expanding the categories from awarding only cinema to also television productions. Spanish crime series Four Seasons in Havana was the first recipient of the award.

Since the creation of the category, no series has won more than once. Argentine series El marginal holds the record of most nominations with three, followed by Narcos: Mexico and El Ministerio del Tiempo with two each. Half of the winners have been Netflix productions.

In the list below the winner of the award for each year is shown first, followed by the other nominees.

Awards and nominations

2010s

2020s

See also
 Latin American television awards

References

Miniseries or TV series
Awards established in 2017